RTÉ Aertel is a teletext service broadcast on RTÉ One and RTÉ2 in Ireland. It was also available in its entirety on the Internet until 2019.

History
The teletext service began development in the mid-1980s (with tests as early as 1985) and was formally launched on 22 June 1987. Originally called simply Aertel, it gained the RTÉ prefix along with RTÉ's other activities from September 2003. The RTÉ.ie news service used to simply wrap Aertel's output into their web pages, with the service also available on WAP.

A selection of RTÉ Aertel pages were broadcast in-vision on rotation overnight on RTÉ Two after normal programming, under the title Nightscreen.

Since the terrestrial analogue switch-off in 2012 and Virgin Media analogue switch-off in 2019, the Aertel teletext service has only been available on satellite.

In April 2018, it reported that RTÉ has asked the Minister for Communications, Climate Action and Environment for permission to reduce the Aertel service on the grounds that it had been superseded by more recent technology. For legal reasons, RTE has to get permission from the Minister to make significant changes to Aertel.

Since September 2019 the RTÉ Aertel internet homepage now merely acts as a series of links or site map of the wider RTÉ website.

In November 2019, it was announced that Aertel would be shut down as part of cost-cutting measures at RTÉ. However, the Section 114(1)(b) of Broadcasting Act 2009 requires RTÉ to operate a teletext service, and Aertel continues to be available on several platforms. Section 114 is planned to be amended by the Online Safety and Media Regulation Act to permit Aertel to be shutdown.

List of pages

RTÉ One and RTÉ2

 103 News
 130 Business
 140 Share Prices
 150 National Lottery
 160 Weather
 170 RTÉ Guide
 200 RTÉ Sport
 300 Entertainment
 590 RTÉ Information Index
 740 HSE COVID-19 Information
 888 Subtitles

RTÉ One
 650 Saorview (Broken Page)

RTÉ2
 650 Superquinn (Broken Page)
 594 Using Aertel
 599 Aertel Mobile

RTÉ Aertel Digital

RTÉ Aertel Digital is currently broadcast on the Saorview service on all RTÉ channels. The service is the same on each channel. RTÉ have proposed providing more improvements with the service over the coming years. It was also proposed that the text service would be carried on their radio services which broadcast on Saorview.

References

External links
 RTÉ Aertel on rte.ie

Aertel
Aertel
Teletext
1987 establishments in Ireland